{{Infobox album
| name       = Broadway in Rhythm
| type       = studio
| artist     = Ray Conniff and His Orchestra and Chorus
| cover      = Broadway in Rhythm.png
| alt        =
| released   = 1961
| recorded   = 
| venue      =
| studio     =
| genre      = Easy listening
| length     =
| label      = Columbia
| producer   = 
| chronology = 
| prev_title = Memories Are Made of This| prev_year  = 1960
| next_title = Somebody Loves Me
| next_year  = 1961
}}Memories Are Made of This is an album by Ray Conniff and His Orchestra and Chorus. It was released in 1961 on the Columbia label (catalog no. CL-1252).

The album debuted on Billboard magazine's popular albums chart on March 27, 1961, peaked at No. 10, and remained on that chart for three weeks.

AllMusic later gave the album a rating of two stars.

Track listing
Side 1
 "Oklahoma!" (from Oklahoma!)
 "People Will Say We're In Love" (from Oklahoma!)
 "The Surrey With The Fringe On Top" (from Oklahoma!)
 "Oh, What A Beautiful Morning" (from Oklahoma!)
 "Hello Young Lovers" (from The King and I)
 "Getting To Know You; I Whistle A Happy Tune" (from The King and I)

Side 2
 "On The Street Where You Live" (from My Fair Lady)
 "I Could Have Danced All Night; I've Grown Accustomed To Her Face" (from My Fair Lady)
 "A Wonderful Guy" (from South Pacific)	
 "Bali Ha'i" (from South Pacific)
 "Younger Than Springtime" (from South Pacific)
 "Some Enchanted Evening" (from South Pacific'')

References

1961 albums
Columbia Records albums
Ray Conniff albums